Rhogogaster viridis is a species of common sawfly in the family Tenthredinidae.

Subspecies
Subspecies include: 
Rhogogaster viridis subsp. montana (Betrem, 1933) 
Rhogogaster viridis subsp. viridis

Distribution and habitat
This species is present in most of Europe (Albania, Austria, Belarus, Belgium, Bosnia and Herzegovina, Bulgaria, Central European Russia, Croatia, Czech Republic, Denmark, Estonia, Finland, France, Germany, Greece, Ireland, Italy, Latvia, Luxembourg, North Macedonia, Norway, Poland, Portugal, Romania, Sweden, Switzerland, Netherlands, and former Yugoslavia) and in the Nearctic realm.  These rather common sawflies can be found mainly in grassy environment, gardens and parks rich in green leaves.

Description
These wasps have light green head and body. The head shows a black drawing in the form of the Greek letter omega, The wings are transparent, with a pterostigma uniformly green or yellow. On the sides of the thorax is present a small black line. On the back of the abdomen of the females  there is a black band. The female have a saw-like ovipositor.

This species is rather similar to Tenthredo olivacea Klug, 1814 and to other species within its complex, including Rhogogaster chlorosoma (Benson, 1943).

Biology
Adults can be found from April to August.  They mainly feed on pollen and nectar but, on sunny summer days, they hunt for insects and suck out their body fluids, feeding especially on Colorado Potato Beetle (Leptinotarsa decemlineata). The larvae are similar to caterpillars, but they have six true legs and several abdominal prolegs. They are phytophagous and feed on a wide range of plant leaves (Quercus (Fagaceae), Stellaria (Caryophyllaceae), Filipendula (Rosaceae), Circaea (Onagraceae), Alnus (Betulaceae), Rubus (Rosaceae), Salix viminalis (Salicaceae), Chamaenerion angustifolium (Onagraceae), Salix and Populus (Salicaceae).

External links
 Photos of larvae at Papillons de Poitou-Charentes
 UK Wildlife
 IK Safari

Bibliography
 Ross H. Arnett, Jr. American Insects: A Handbook of the Insects of America North of Mexico, Second Edition CRC Press
 Krombein, Karl V. Catalog of hymenoptera in America north of Mexico Smithsonian Institution Press
Zhelokhovtsev A.N., Tobias V.I., Kozlov M.A. 1993. -. Vol. 3. Hymenoptera. Part 6.

References 

Tenthredinidae
Sawflies described in 1758
Taxa named by Carl Linnaeus